Andrew Thomas McCarthy (born November 29, 1962) is an American actor, travel writer, and television director. He is most known as a member of the Brat Pack, with roles in 1980s films such as St. Elmo's Fire, Pretty in Pink, and Less than Zero. He is ranked No. 40 on VH1's 100 Greatest Teen Stars of all-time list. As a director, he is known for his work on Orange Is the New Black.

Early life and education
McCarthy was born in Westfield, New Jersey, the third of four boys. His mother worked for a newspaper, and his father was involved in investments and stocks. McCarthy moved to Bernardsville, New Jersey, as a teenager and attended Bernards High School and the Pingry School, a preparatory academy. At Pingry, he played the Artful Dodger in Oliver!, his first acting role. After graduating from high school, he enrolled at NYU for acting, but was expelled after two years.

Career
McCarthy's first major role was in the 1983 comedy Class opposite Jacqueline Bisset. He was a member of the 1980s Hollywood group of young actors dubbed by the media as the "Brat Pack". The group starred in a few films, among them St. Elmo's Fire and Pretty in Pink. McCarthy appeared in the 1987 films Mannequin and Less than Zero, a cinematic adaptation of Bret Easton Ellis's novel. In 1985, McCarthy starred with Donald Sutherland and Kevin Dillon in Heaven Help Us (also known as Catholic Boys) as Michael Dunn. McCarthy made his Broadway debut in The Boys of Winter. He quickly returned to Hollywood in 1988 to star in several films, such as Fresh Horses and Kansas. He had another hit with the 1989 comedy film Weekend at Bernie's.

He returned to Broadway to star in Side Man, and the production won the 1999 Tony Award for Best Play. In 2003 McCarthy was set to guest star in two episodes of Law & Order: Criminal Intent. Due to bad relations with actor Vincent D'Onofrio, series creator Dick Wolf decided against it. Wolf later stated, "Mr. McCarthy engaged in fractious behavior from the moment he walked on the set." McCarthy fired back in a statement of his own saying, "I was fired because I refused to allow a fellow actor to threaten me with physical violence, bully me and try to direct me." Despite this incident, he later guest starred in an episode of Law & Order: Criminal Intent (with Chris Noth, not D'Onofrio) that originally aired in November 2007.  In 2004, he played Dr. Hook in Kingdom Hospital. He appeared in five episodes of the 2005 NBC television series E-Ring. In 2008, he starred in the NBC television series Lipstick Jungle as billionaire Joe Bennett and had a minor role in The Spiderwick Chronicles.

McCarthy directed several episodes of the hit CW television series Gossip Girl, including "Touch of Eva" in the fourth season. 
In 2010 and 2011, he appeared in the hit USA show White Collar. He returned to the series in the next season to direct the episode "Neighborhood Watch". In 2015, he directed three episodes in Season 2 of the NBC hit television show The Blacklist starring James Spader and Megan Boone. In 2016, he starred in the short-lived ABC drama The Family.
Since 2020, he has had a recurring role in NBC's TV series Good Girls. In April 2022, McCarthy joined the cast of The Resident as Ian Sullivan (guest season 5) a renowned pediatric surgeon and Cade's estranged father. On July 11, 2022, it was announced that he was promoted to series regular for the sixth season.

Writing
McCarthy began travel writing and served as an Editor at Large at National Geographic Traveler magazine. In 2010, McCarthy was escorted out of an underground church in Lalibela, Ethiopia, for entering the site without documentation. He had been in the church on assignment for the travel magazine Afar. McCarthy's book The Longest Way Home: One Man's Quest for the Courage to Settle Down was published in 2012.

In February 2015, National Geographic published McCarthy's account, titled "A Song for Ireland", of his return to the house in the townland of Lacka West in the parish of Duagh in County Kerry in Ireland from which his great-grandfather John McCarthy had emigrated in the late 1800s.

McCarthy has received several awards from SATW (Society of American Travel Writers), including Travel Journalist of the Year in 2010.

In 2017, Algonquin Books published McCarthy's YA novel, Just Fly Away. The novel became a New York Times bestseller.

McCarthy's memoir about his life and career in the 1980s, titled Brat: An '80s Story, was released in May 2021 by Grand Central Publishing.

Personal life

In 1992, McCarthy entered a detoxification program and has been sober since. In 2004, he announced that he once had a serious alcohol problem, which began at age 12.

In 1999, McCarthy married his college sweetheart Carol Schneider 20 years after they first dated. He later stated his reasons for tracking her down after they had drifted apart: "I ran into someone who said they had seen Carol and her boyfriend and they seemed really happy, and for some reason it bothered me for a week. I called her and asked her if she was really with this guy and asked her out for coffee." In 2002, Schneider gave birth to a son, Sam, who also became an actor. McCarthy and Schneider divorced in 2005.

On August 28, 2011, McCarthy married Irish writer and director Dolores Rice. They have two children.

Filmography

Film

Television

Awards and nominations
Fantafestival
1987: Won, "Best Actor" – Mannequin

Rhode Island International Film Festival
2004: Won, Grand Prize for "Best Short Film" – News for the Church – qualifying it as an Official Entry with the Academy Awards for Best Live Action Short Film
Full Info Including Original Motion Picture Soundtrack CD produced by Al Gomes and A. Michelle of Big Noise

Sedona International Film Festival
2005: Won, "Best Short Film" – News for the Church

References

External links

 
 
 
 
 Official website

1962 births
Male actors from New Jersey
Male actors from New York City
American male film actors
American male television actors
American television directors
Bernards High School alumni
Circle in the Square Theatre School alumni
Living people
Tisch School of the Arts alumni
People from Bernardsville, New Jersey
People from Greenwich Village
People from Westfield, New Jersey
Pingry School alumni
20th-century American male actors
21st-century American male actors